Associazione Calcio Prato is an Italian association football club, based in Prato, Tuscany.

Prato currently plays in Serie D/E, having last been in Serie B in 1964.

History
The club was founded in 1908.

In season 2010–11 the team played in Lega Pro Seconda Divisione ranking 3rd and was beaten from Carrarese in the final of the play-off, but it was later admitted to Lega Pro Prima Divisione to fill vacancies.

Colors and badge
The team's colors are blue, white and gold (like the cornflower).

Famous players and managers

Notable former players include Christian Vieri, Alessandro Diamanti (2nd place at Euro 2012), Vittorio Rossi (Paolo Rossi's father), Massimo Maccarone, Massimo Oddo (World Champion in 2006), Alessandro Matri, Paolo Cecconi & Carlo Cudicini. Notable former managers include Giovanni Ferrari (World Champion in 1934 & 1938), Ferruccio Valcareggi & Enzo Bearzot (World Champion in 1982).

Current squad

Out on loan

Honours

League
 Serie C
 Winners: 1940–41 (group E), 1945–46 (group A), 1948–49 (group C), 1956–57, 1959–60 (group B), 1962–63 (group B)
 Serie C2
 Winners: 1979–80 (group A), 1982–83 (group A), 2001–02 (group A)
 Serie D
 Winners: 1953–54 (group E), 1976–77 (group E)

Cups
 Coppa Italia Serie C
 Winners: 2000–01

References

External links
 

 
Football clubs in Tuscany
Association football clubs established in 1908
Italian football First Division clubs
Serie B clubs
Serie C clubs
Serie D clubs
1908 establishments in Italy
Coppa Italia Serie C winning clubs